The magisterium is the teaching authority of the Catholic Church. It may also refer to:

 The magisterium, also known in alchemy as the philosopher's stone

 Non-overlapping magisteria, a view on the relationship between religion and science proposed by Stephen Jay Gould
 Magisterium of Pius XII, a collection of works by Pope Pius XII
 The Magisterium Series, a fantasy novel series by Holly Black and Cassandra Clare
 The Magisterium, a fictional religious organization in Philip Pullman's trilogy of fantasy novels His Dark Materials